{{Speciesbox
| image = Larryleachia perlata (Apocynaceae Asclepiadoideae) (39490954920).jpg
| genus = Larryleachia
| species = perlata
| authority = (Dinter) Plowes
| synonyms = *Ceropegia perlata
Hoodia perlata
'Lavrania perlataLeachia perlataLeachiella perlataTrichocaulon cinereumTrichocaulon kubusanumTrichocaulon kubusenseTrichocaulon perlatumTrichocaulon truncatum}}Larryleachia perlata'' is a species of flowering plant the family  Apocynaceae. The species is a succulent plant species. The species is considered an insufficiently known species.

The plant can get up to 30 cm tall and the stems can be 2.5 cm to 6 cm.

The species is native to South Africa and Namibia. It occurs on both sides of the Orange river. 

The species is threatened by erosion and overgrazing.

References 

perlata
Flora of Southern Africa
Taxa named by Kurt Dinter